Live at the Con is a collaborative live album by ARIA Award winning artists, Brian Cadd and Russell Morris. The album was released on 3 November 2007, following Cadd's induction in the ARIA Hall of Fame a month earlier.

The album was recorded on 9th and 10 March 2007, with the Queensland Conservatorium Orchestra, where Cadd and Morris performed tracks from their 40-year careers.

Track listing

Release history

References

2007 live albums
Russell Morris albums
Brian Cadd albums
Collaborative albums
Self-released albums